Venafiorita Airport, also known as Olbia-Venafiorita Airport  was a public and military airport which serviced the town of Olbia, Sardinia, Italy. It was replaced from the Olbia-Costa Smeralda Airport in the 1970s.

It was the main hub for the Alisarda airlines.

Today the former Venafiorita airport hosts the 10th Carabinieri helicopter Unit.

References 

Transport in Olbia
Airports in Sardinia